"Alone" is the third and final single released from Swedish boy band E.M.D.'s debut album A State of Mind. On its fourth week on the chart it reached the top position, becoming E.M.D.'s third consecutive number one-single in Sweden.

Track listing
 "Alone (Album Version)" - 3:47
 "Alone (Instrumental)" - 3:47

Charts

References

2008 singles
Number-one singles in Sweden
E.M.D. songs
2008 songs
Ariola Records singles
Songs written by Andreas Romdhane
Songs written by Josef Larossi